Nicholasville is an unincorporated community in Walton County, in the U.S. state of Georgia.

History
A variant name was "Nickelville". According to tradition, the community was first called "Nickelville" because whiskey drinks  were sold at the local country store for just one nickel.

References

Unincorporated communities in Walton County, Georgia